"Sine from Above" is a song by American singer Lady Gaga and English musician Elton John from the former's sixth studio album, Chromatica (2020). It is included as the album's fourteenth track, and is preceded by a string arrangement, "Chromatica III", which leads right into the beginning of the song. It was produced  by BloodPop, Burns, Axwell, Liohn and Johannes Klahr, and had a wide array of songwriters involved. It is an electronica-influenced electropop song with a drum n' bass breakdown, and lyrically it talks about the healing power of music.

Several music critics found "Sine from Above" one of Chromatica standouts and appreciated its experimental nature, whereas some others were critical of the breakdown of the track and the use of vocal effects on John's voice. The song had minor chart placements in a few countries, and in the United States it reached a peak position of number 14 on the Billboard Dance/Electronic Songs chart. Gaga sang a stripped-down version of "Sine from Above" in a Valentino campaign video, while a remix edit by Chester Lockhart, Mood Killer and Lil Texas appeared on her remix album, Dawn of Chromatica (2021).

Background and recording 
"Sine from Above" marks the second studio based collaboration between Lady Gaga and Elton John, following their duet "Hello, Hello", which appeared in the 2011 animated film Gnomeo & Juliet. The duo also performed together on numerous occasions, including the 52nd Annual Grammy Awards, where they performed a medley of Gaga's "Speechless" and John's "Your Song", and the Lady Gaga and the Muppets Holiday Spectacular television special, where they performed "Bennie and the Jets" and "Artpop". Gaga later professionally recorded John's "Your Song" for the 2018 tribute album Revamp.

Gaga and John developed a long-time friendship, and Gaga referred to him as her "mentor for a long time". In an interview with Zane Lowe on Apple Music, Gaga talked about her work with John on "Sine from Above", and explained how he played a significant role in her road to recovery:

"Sine from Above" was produced  by BloodPop, Burns, Axwell, Liohn and Johannes Klahr, and had a wide array of songwriters involved. Axwell talked about how the song came about in an interview for Rolling Stone, stating: "I had this old song we worked on, like, seven years ago with Elton John. We tried working on it and we couldn't really get it where we wanted it. It was also kind of hard to get ahold of Elton John. I had this on my computer and was like, 'Wait a minute. Lady Gaga and Elton John are buddies.'" Axwell then sent the demo to Gaga and co-producer BloodPop who loved the track and decided to record it for Gaga's Chromatica (2020) album as a collaboration with John. He later added that the song was initially "a more chilled out, piano, acoustic thing. You can still hear that in the verses, and [the final version has] the same chord progression."

Talking about the recording of the song, co-producer Burns explained that John was on tour in Australia when they were in the process of finishing the song. As they had a close deadline to finish everything, the recording sessions took place via Skype, with Elton in a studio in Australia and the rest of them in Los Angeles. According to John, "Sine from Above" came in a period of his career when he wasn't keen to write any new songs with his long-term collaborator Bernie Taupin, and instead he featured on other musician's songs as a guest performer, "and went back a bit into being a session musician."

Composition 
"Sine from Above" is an electronica-influenced electropop track which includes trance synths and a drum-and-bass breakdown at the end of the song. Burns said that the ending was the singer's idea: "Originally, my first version had an 'Amen'-style break beat throughout it, but in the end, we opted for a four-to-the-floor rhythm. At the last minute, Gaga thought there should be some kind of crazy, jarring outro. She mentioned speeding it up, so I figured why not bring back the 'Amen' break, but in classic Jungle form." In an interview with American Songwriter, Gaga said "I wanted this song to have a range, where it began in a very organic, melodic way and then it ended in some sort of cacophony. A cacophony that I'm now comfortable with", claiming it is about resilience. According to the sheet music published on Musicnotes.com, the song is written in the time signature of common time, and is composed in the key of C minor with a tempo of 122 beats per minute. The vocals range from the tonal nodes of B3 to E5.

Lyrically, the song talks about the healing power of music and Gaga's relationship with a higher power. Gaga explained the wordplay in the title as a reference to how music was an escape for her when she was in pain. She said: "S-I-N-E, because it's a sound wave. That sound, sine, from above is what healed me to be able to dance my way out of this album... That was later in the recording process that I actually was like, 'And now let me pay tribute to the very thing that has revived me, and that is music." The sine wave also appears on the cover art for Chromatica, and based on its lyrics Billboard considered "Sine from Above" to be "Gaga's mission statement for the album". In the interpration of the Los Angeles Times''' Mikael Wood, the track is "about feeling young when you're immortal."

 "Chromatica III" 

"Sine from Above" is one of the three songs on the Chromatica album which are preceded by an orchestral interlude, transitioning directly into the track, as Gaga wanted to emphasize the "cinematic" feeling of the record and felt that it had distinct acts. The preceding interlude, "Chromatica III" was composed by musician Morgan Kibby, who assembled a 26-person orchestra to record the string arrangement. Talking about the creating process, Kibby said:

While reviewing the album, Patrick Gomez of The A.V. Club called the piece an "unexpected highlight", and compared it to a Hans Zimmer score. "Chromatica III" was later featured in the music video for the song "911", playing in the background in a scene which shows Gaga crying after being involved in a car accident.

Canadian singer and producer Grimes was set to remix the interlude for Dawn of Chromatica (2021), as well as "Chromatica I" and "Chromatica II"; however, her contributions did not make the final cut.

 Critical reception 

Nick Smith of MusicOMH thought that the collaboration was "rather inspired" and "perhaps the album's highlight". Brittany Spanos from Rolling Stone complimented the production as well as John's vocals saying "John's smooth, deep voice make him a perfect fit, making it sound like he's been gunning to become a disco vocalist for the entirety of his career." Hannah Mylrea from NME called the song "brilliantly bizarre" saying it "is basically what a heady night out at Glastonbury's Shangri La with Elton and Gaga would sound like". Writing for Pitchfork, Katherine St. Asaph found it one of the two strongest songs on the album, that "runs on WTF", and described it this way: "Imagine an axis from bizarro transcendence to pure transcendence; 'Sine from Above' is all the way at the left." Jem Aswad Variety thought that John gives a "stately vocal performance" as the sole male voice on the otherwise "very female and feminine" album. Vulture, an online blog associated with New York Magazine, found "Sine from Above" "as grand a track as Gaga has ever recorded", and highlighted the "frenetic drum-and-bass breakdown that you wish went twice as long". Michael Cragg from The Guardian called the song "ludicrous", and opined that it "would win Eurovision on any given year." He underscored the "unexpected shift into cranium-rattling drum'n'bass, a fleeting taste of experimentation that feels oddly missing elsewhere [on the album]."

Stephen Daw of Billboard thought that the song "feels special", but called the final 30 seconds of the song "confusing" and "unnecessary", stating that "the effects laid over [Elton John's] voice falter as it slips into an uncanny valley." Sal Cinquemani of Slant Magazine thought that "Sine from Above" was the most experimental track on Chromatica with its sudden drum n' bass drop, but opined that it's "a trick Björk pulled off to more dramatic effect on her 2011 single 'Crystalline'." Patrick Gomez from The A.V. Club found it an "odd inclusion" on the album, saying that "[John's] vocals are unfortunately jarring when he comes in on the second verse, and there's something unharmonious about how their voices come together here." Simon K. from Sputnikmusic while complimented the production in the song, thought that the "track which once displayed real potential [is] completely stained by fundamental, asinine errors", and called John's contribution "godawful". Caryn Ganz of The New York Times deemed it "a shapeless E.D.M. disaster".

 Chart performance 
In the Billboard issue dated June 13, 2020, "Sine from Above" debuted on the Bubbling Under Hot 100 Singles chart at number sixteen, and on the Hot Dance/Electronic Digital Songs at number fourteen. It was John's first ever appearance on the latter ranking. On the UK Singles Downloads Chart, compiled by the Official Charts Company (OCC), the song debuted at number 68 after the album's release, but four months later, in October, it reached a new peak of number 59. "Sine from Above" also peaked at number 93 in Australia, at number 200 in France, at number 94 in Greece, at number 109 in Portugal, at number 82 in Scotland, and at number 80 in Venezuela.

 Other versions 
On September 17, 2020, a stripped-down version of "Sine from Above" was featured in the video campaign for Valentino's Voce Viva fragrance. Gaga appeared in the video singing the song along with a group of models. The video includes the motto "My voice, My strength" by Gaga, who explained why she chose "Sine from Above" for the campaign: 

 Remix 

For Gaga's third remix album, Dawn of Chromatica, "Sine from Above" was reimagined by Chester Lockhart, Mood Killer and Lil Texas. Lockhart was contacted by friend Bloodpop, who asked if the three of them would be willing to complete a remix in two days. After agreeing to take on the project, the trio distributed the task into three parts, with Lockhart handling the first minute and a half, Mood Killer doing John's part, and Lil Texas the final third of the track. Lil Texas said they intended to do the remix "the hardcore way", with Lockhart adding: "the song just gets crazier and crazier and crazier as it goes along. It starts off with a lot of energy and then it goes into clown circus demon territory magician. And then it becomes fully guillotine, just chop your whole head off at the end. And that's what a song should be." They were inspired by the orchestral moments and the use of imagery in the lyrics on the original album, saxophones and circus music, and Gaga's 2014 single "G.U.Y.". They also noted the impact of Scottish music producer Sophie on their work, saying that all of them are "a huge fan of hers and she's an idol to so many of us."

The remix was described as "dubstep-meets-punk" by Entertainment Weekly Joey Nolfi, while Pitchfork Jamieson Cox found "a bit of Artpop in its flatulent digital provocation." It features distorted bass, glitched trap, drum & bass, thunder strikes, cartoonish sound samples, a saxophone solo and finishes with hardstyle music. Writing for Gigwise, Alex Rigotti likened it to "a haunted house on acid" and called it the best track on the Dawn of Chromatica album, saying: "This remix is so expressive, experimental, and ballsy, straining Gaga and Sir Elton John's vocals to the very limit, until it all comes crashing down. It's Gaga like we've never heard her before." Neil Z. Yeung of AllMusic thought it was the "most chaotic remix" on the record with "a crushing breakdown that finally delivers on the surprise drum'n'bass outro of the original." Paper Mag Hilton Dresden called it "an amazing remix", with "a lot of moving parts", and opined that compared to the other remixes on the album "none go quite as hard" as this one. Conversely, Robin Murray from Clash found it one of the missteps of the album, saying that "the dense effects seem to distort the song, and it’s perhaps a case of too-many-cooks." Vinyl Chapters Caillou Pettis, who favorably reviewed the album, considered this remix one of the few "quite unmemorable" ones. Alexa Camp of Slant Magazine called the remix "a Frankensteinian abomination that chops up and distorts guest Elton John's vocals, making an even bigger mockery of the legendary musician than the original did."

On the day of Dawn of Chromatica release, Gaga posted a video of herself with cartoon filters through her social media, which included a snippet from the breakdown of the "Sine from Above" remix, along with a message encouraging her followers to "smile and dance through the pain". The remix peaked at number 39 on the Billboard'' Hot Dance/Electronic Songs chart.

Credits and personnel 
Credits adapted from Tidal.

"Sine from Above" 

 Lady Gaga – vocals, songwriter
 Elton John – vocals, songwriter
 BloodPop – producer, songwriter, guitar, keyboards, percussion, bass, drums
 Klahr – producer, songwriter, guitar, keyboards, percussion, bass, drums
 Axwell – producer, songwriter, guitar, keyboards, percussion, bass, drums
 Liohn – producer, songwriter, guitar, keyboards, percussion, bass, drums
 Burns – producer, guitar, keyboards
 Rami Yacoub – additional producer, songwriter
 Benjamin Rice – songwriter, mixer, recording engineer, vocal producer
 Ryan Tedder – songwriter
 Sebastian Ingrosso – songwriter
 Vincent Pontare – songwriter
 Salem Al Fakir – songwriter
 Tom Norris – mixer
 E. Scott Kelly – assistant mixer
 Randy Merrill – mastering engineer

"Chromatica III" 

 Lady Gaga – composition, production
 Morgan Kibby – composition, production
 Ian Walker – bass
 Giovanna M Clayton – cello
 Timothy E Loo – cello
 Vanessa Freebairn-Smith – cello
 Amie Doherty – conductor
 Allen Fogle – French horn, horn
 Dylan Hurt – French horn, horn
 Katelyn Faraudo – French horn, horn
 Laura K Brenes – French horn, horn
 Mark Adams – French horn, horn
 Teag Reaves – French horn, horn
 Nicholas Daley – trombone
 Reginald Yound – trombone
 Steven M. Holtman – trombone
 Andrew Duckles – viola
 Erol Rynearson – viola
 Linnea Powell – viola
 Meredith Crawford – viola
 Alyssa Park – violin
 Chart Bisharat – violin
 Jessica Guideri – violin
 Luanne Homzy – violin
 Lucia Micarelli – violin
 Marisa Kuney – violin
 Neel Hammond – violin
 Shalini Vijayan – violin
 Songa Lee – violin
 Mike Schuppan – mixing, studio personnel
 Randy Merrill – mastering, studio personnel
 Gina Zimmitti – orchestra contractor
 Whitney Martin – orchestra contractor

Charts

Weekly charts

Year-end charts

Notes

References

2020 singles
2020 songs
Electropop songs
Elton John songs
Lady Gaga songs
Male–female vocal duets
Song recordings produced by BloodPop
Song recordings produced by Rami Yacoub
Songs with music by Elton John
Songs written by Axwell
Songs written by BloodPop
Songs written by Lady Gaga
Songs written by Rami Yacoub
Songs written by Ryan Tedder
Songs written by Salem Al Fakir
Songs written by Sebastian Ingrosso
Songs written by Vincent Pontare